The Timok (Serbian and Bulgarian: Тимок), sometimes also known as Great Timok, is a river in eastern Serbia, a right tributary of the Danube. For the last 15 km of its run it forms a border between eastern Serbia and western Bulgaria.

It is a branchy system of many shorter rivers, many of them having the same name (Timok), only clarified with adjectives. From the farthest source in the system, that of the Svrljiški Timok, until its confluence (as Veliki Timok), the Timok is 202 km long. The Timok Valley is known for the most important Romanian-speaking population in Eastern Serbia.

Its name stems from antiquity, in Latin it was known as Timacus and in Ancient Greek Timachos", Τίμαχος.

 Drainage system 
The Timok, also named Veliki Timok to distinguish it from its tributaries, is formed by the confluence of the rivers Beli Timok ("White Timok") and Crni Timok ("Black Timok") at Zaječar. The Beli Timok is formed by the confluence of the rivers Svrljiški Timok ("Svrljig Timok") and Trgoviški Timok ("Trgovište Timok") at Knjaževac.

Tributaries of the Timok are Duboki Dol, Beslarica, Golami Dol, Kijevska, Bračevicka, Studena Voda, Pivnica and Eleshchev from the right, and Lipovička River, Crna reka, Jelašnička reka, Salaška reka, Ogašu Taba, Brusnički potok, Urovički potok, Plandište and Sikolska river from the left.

 Course 

The Timok turns north-west after its formation at Zaječar, running next to the villages of Vražogrnac, Trnavac, Čokonjar, and Brusnik. Passing between the last two it leaves the Timok Valley and enters the Negotin Valley.

In the lower course the Timok has no major settlements on the Serbian side (though flowing only 7 km from Negotin). Some 15 km before it empties into the Danube as its right tributary, the Timok becomes a border river, passing next to the Bulgarian town of Bregovo and the Bulgarian village of Baley. The river's mouth represents the northernmost point of Bulgaria, and is only 28 m above sea level, which makes it the lowest point of Serbia. The average discharge is 24 m³/s, but it can grow to 40 m³/s, and the Timok is part of the Black Sea drainage basin. The main (right) tributaries in this section are Crna reka, Salaška reka, Sikolska reka and Čubarska reka (Cyrillic: Црна река, Салашка река, Сиколска река and Чубарска река).

Apart from the Timok Valley, the Timok gave its name to a rebellion against Serbian king Milan Obrenović IV in 1883, as Timočka Rebellion.

 Economy and ecology 

At Čokonjar, the Sokolovica power plant was constructed in 1947–1951. Opportunities for higher electricity production are not used.

The river has been greatly ecologically damaged in recent years by the mining and heavy metal industry in Bor and Krivelj and is consequently polluting the Danube with lead, copper and cadmium.

The river valley is a natural route for the road and railway Niš - Prahovo.

 See also 
 Rivers in Serbia
 Rivers in Bulgaria

 References 

 Mala Prosvetina Enciklopedija, Third edition (1985); Prosveta; 
 Jovan Đ. Marković (1990): Enciklopedijski geografski leksikon Jugoslavije''; Svjetlost-Sarajevo;

External links

Rivers of Serbia
Timok Valley
Nišava District
Zaječar District
Bor District
Rivers of Bulgaria
Landforms of Vidin Province
International rivers of Europe
Bulgaria–Serbia border